Lucy Street is a Swedish pop group that consisted of Johanna Lidén, Karolina Dahlman and Malin Sjöquist. In 2000, the group scored a hit with the single "Girl Next Door". Their debut music album was called ”Lucy Street”.

The group also recorded a version of the song White Horses, originally recorded by Jackie Lee (Irish singer) for the soundtrack of the film Me Without You (film)

Discography

Singles

References

Swedish musical trios
Musical groups established in 1999
Swedish pop music groups
1999 establishments in Sweden